The 2000 South American Rugby Championship "B" was the first edition of the competition of the second level national Rugby Union teams in South America.

The tournament was played in São Paulo, with three teams participating.

Brasil won the tournament.

Standings 

 Three points for victory, two for a draw, and one for a loss 
{| class="wikitable"
|-
!width=165|Team
!width=40|Played
!width=40|Won
!width=40|Drawn
!width=40|Lost
!width=40|For
!width=40|Against
!width=40|Difference
!width=40|Pts
|- bgcolor=#ccffcc align=center
|align=left| 
|2||2||0||0||83||12||+ 71||6
|- align=center
|align=left| 
|2||1||0||1||66||43||+ 23||4
|- align=center
|align=left| 
|2||0||0||2||13||107||- 94||2
|}

Results

References

2000
B
rugby union
rugby union
rugby union
International rugby union competitions hosted by Brazil
2000 rugby union tournaments for national teams